White Carniola (or Weiße Mark) is a traditional region in southeastern Slovenia on the border with Croatia. Due to its smallness, it is often considered a subunit of the broader Lower Carniola region, although with distinctive cultural, linguistic, and historical features.

Due to its proximity with Croatia, White Carniola shares many cultural and linguistic features with the neighboring Kajkavian Croatian areas. It is generally considered the Slovenian region with the closest cultural affinity with other South Slavic territories. It was part of Slavonia until the 12th century, after which it shared the historical fate with the Windic March and Lower Carniola to the north. During the 19th century, it was one of the regions with the highest emigration rate in the Slovene Lands, and the Austrian Empire in general. During World War II, it was an important center of anti-Fascist resistance in Slovenia.

Geography

The area is confined by the Gorjanci and Kočevski Rog mountain ranges in the north and west and the Kolpa River in the south and east, which also forms part of the border between Slovenia and Croatia. As the area could only be reached from northern Lower Carniola by mountain passes, the inhabitants cultivate a certain distinctness.

The region corresponds to the present-day municipalities of Metlika, Črnomelj and Semič. The terrain is characterised by low karst hills and extensive birch forests. The main river is the Kolpa with its Lahinja, Dobličica and Krupa tributaries.

White Carniola is known for Grič and Kanižarica pottery from clay with a distinct calcite content, as well as for high-quality wines, such as metliška črnina (a dark red wine), belokranjec (a white wine), and modra frankinja (i.e. Blaufränkisch).

Tradition 

A distinguishing part of White Carniola is its folk heritage. It still has many folklore events, which show traditional local costumes, music, played on a regionally known instrument called tamburica, and a circle dance, called belokranjsko kolo. A distinctive feature is also the pisanica, a coloured Easter egg decorated in a characteristic manner using beeswax that is found nowhere else in Slovenia. Belokranjska pogača (White Carniola flatbread) has recently been granted the European Union's Traditional Speciality Guaranteed designation.

Name
The name Bela krajina literally means 'White March'. The noun krajina or 'march' refers to a border territory organized for military defense. The adjective bela 'white' may refer to the deciduous trees (especially birch trees) in the area in comparison to "black" (i.e. coniferous) trees in the neighboring Kočevje area. It may also be an old designation for 'west', referring to the western location of the region in comparison to the Croatian Military Frontier. Non-linguistic explanations connect the designation bela with the traditional white linen clothing of the population. The English name "White Carniola" derives from the German designation Weißkrain, which is the result of a hypercorrection based on the adjective belokrajnski (understood as a dialect metathesis of *belokranjski) (cf. also German Dürrenkrain, English: Dry Carniola, for Slovene Suha krajina, literally 'dry region').

History

Middle Ages

In the early 12th century, the area was part of the disputed border region between the March of Carniola, established by the Holy Roman Empire in the northwest, and the Kingdom of Hungary in the east and southeast. From about 1127 the local counts of Višnja Gora (Weichselberg) backed by the Spanheim margraves and the Salzburg archbishops crossed the Gorjanci mountains and marched against the Hungarian and Croatian forces, which they pushed beyond the Kolpa River down to Bregana.

The Counts of Weichselberg, who traced their lineage to Saint Hemma of Gurk, established their residence at Metlika (Möttling), and therefore in contemporary sources their lands were also referred to as the County of Möttling (Metlika). After the line became extinct in 1209, the possessions passed to the Carniolan margraves from the House of Andechs, the self-styled Dukes of Merania. In 1229, the area was passed as a dowry of Agnes of Merania to Frederick II of Austria, the last Babenberg ruler, and after his death to Agnes's second husband Ulrich of Spanheim, lord of Carniola and duke of Carinthia. After Ulrich's death in 1269, all of his possessions were inherited by his cousin Ottokar II of Bohemia, who was however defeated by Holy Roman Emperor Rudolf of Habsburg and his allies in 1278. Rudolf gave the County of Metlika as a feif to his ally Albert I of Gorizia, together with the eastern portion of the neighboring Windic March. Under his descendant Albert III of Gorizia, these two adjacent areas were united in what became known as the County in the (Windic) March and in Metlika, and became officially a separate estate of the Holy Roman Empire in 1368. After Albert's death in 1374, the county was acquired by Archduke Rudolf IV of Austria for the House of Habsburg, who confirmed its privileges, thus maintaining it separate from the Duchy of Carniola. The county was soon leased out to the House of Celje, which acquired full rights of the lords of the land in 1443. It remained part of the Celje domains until their extinction in 1457, whereafter it reverted to the Habsburgs, who gradually incorporated it into Carniola.

Early modern period
With the Ottoman conquest of Serbian territories, groups of Serbs fled to the north or west; of the western migrational groups, some settled in White Carniola and Žumberak. Vlachs and Uskoks to White Carniola and Žumberak coming from Croatia and Bosnia. The Habsburg commanders brought from Bosnia, later and from parts of Croatia and Dalmatia hundreds or thousands of families and settled them in area which covers White Carniola, across the Žumberak Mountains all the way to Vinica. In September 1597, with the fall of Slatina, some 1,700 Uskoks with their wives and children settled in Carniola, bringing some 4,000 sheep with them. The following year, with the conquest of Cernik, some 500 Uskok families settled in Carniola. At the end of the 17th century, with the stagnation of Ottoman power due to European pressure during internal crisis, and Austrian advance far into Macedonia, Serbs armed themselves and joined the fight against the Ottomans; the Austrian retreat prompted another massive exodus of Serbs from the Ottoman territories  1690 (see Great Serb Migrations).

In his 1689 work The Glory of the Duchy of Carniola, the historian Johann Weikhard von Valvasor described the language, clothing, and customs of the people of White Carniola region as Croatian. The self-identification of students on the university registers in Graz and Vienna between 1643 and 1712 shows that as many as 88% of students from White Carniola identified as Croats, and only 12% as Carniolans. The provincial designation 'Croats' (Crovathen/Crobathen) was used for White Carniola in 1709, and the name 'Croats' for the inhabitants of White Carniola is found in 1725 in a report by a doctor named Zalokar from Novo Mesto. The dialect of the parish of Vinica in far southern White Carniola was marked as Croatian in 1795.

Buildings

Castles

Several castles were built in the border region, especially during the Ottoman Wars from the 15th century onwards, as in Črnomelj, Gradac and Vinica. The remains of the large fortress in Pobrežje were destroyed in World War II.

Culture
Based on surnames found in White Carniola, it may be concluded that their ancestors were Serbs and Croats. In old folk poetry of White Carniola, Serbian hero Prince Marko is often mentioned, sung in "clean Shtokavian". A small Serb community exists in White Carniola.

Notable people 
Notable people that were born or lived in White Carniola include:
Juro Adlešič (1884–1968), lawyer and politician, mayor of Ljubljana from 1935 to 1942
Draga Ahačič (1924–2022), actress, film director, translator, and journalist
Andrej Bajuk (1943–2011), politician and economist
Joe Cerne (born 1942), American football player
Oton Gliha (1914–1999), Croatian painter
Miran Jarc (1900–1942), writer, poet, playwright, and essayist
Lojze Krakar (1926–1995), poet, translator, editor, literary historian, and essayist
Radko Polič (1942–2022), actor
John Vertin (1844–1899), Catholic priest, Bishop of Marquette in the US state of Michigan from 1879 to 1899
Oton Župančič (1878–1949), poet, playwright, and translator

References

External links 

 
Subdivisions of Carniola
Historical regions in Slovenia